George Errington may refer to:
 George Errington (martyr) (died 1596), English Roman Catholic martyr, beatified 1987
 George Errington (bishop) (1804–1884), Roman Catholic churchman, Bishop of Plymouth 1851–55, Coadjutor Archbishop of Westminster 1855–60
 Sir George Errington, 1st Baronet (1839–1920), Irish politician, MP for Longford 1874–85

See also 
 Errington (surname)